Helen Kennedy (born 16 August 1949) is a Canadian former backstroke, butterfly, freestyle and medley swimmer. She competed in six events at the 1964 Summer Olympics.

References

External links
 

1949 births
Living people
Canadian female backstroke swimmers
Canadian female butterfly swimmers
Canadian female freestyle swimmers
Canadian female medley swimmers
Olympic swimmers of Canada
Swimmers at the 1964 Summer Olympics
Swimmers from London, Ontario
Commonwealth Games medallists in swimming
Swimmers at the 1966 British Empire and Commonwealth Games
Commonwealth Games gold medallists for Canada
Commonwealth Games silver medallists for Canada
20th-century Canadian women
Medallists at the 1966 British Empire and Commonwealth Games